Hubert Henno (born 6 October 1976 in Boulogne-Billancourt, Hauts-de-Seine) is a French volleyball player, a member of France men's national volleyball team. He was participant of the Olympic Games Athens 2004, bronze medalist of the World Championship 2002, silver medalist of the European Championship (2003, 2009),  four-time French Champion, double Italian Champion, and Russian Champion.

Career

Clubs
In 2002-2005 spent in Tours VB and won two French Cups (2003, 2004) and his fourth title of French Champion (2003/2004). In season 2004/2005 won CEV Champions League with the Tours VB and was awarded Best Libero. then moved to Russian League, to VC Dynamo Moscow and as a player of this team achieve title of Russian Champion 2006. In 2006-2008 was the M. Roma Volley player. Season 2008/2009 played for Volley Forlì. Next three season spent as a player of Bre Banca Lannutti Cuneo. In season 2009/2010 won Italian SuperCup 2009 and Championship. In 2010/2011 won Italian Cup and silver medal of Italian Championship. In 2012 moved to Lube Banca Macerata. In 2013/2014, the team won Scudetto (Italian Champion) after matches against Sir Safety Perugia.

Sporting achievements

Clubs

CEV Champions League
  2000/2001 - with Paris Volley
  2004/2005 - with Tours VB

CEV Cup
  2007/2008 - M. Roma Volley
  2009/2010 - Bre Banca Lannutti Cuneo

National championships
 1999/2000  French Cup, with Paris Volley
 1999/2000  European SuperCup, with Paris Volley
 1999/2000  French Championship, with Paris Volley
 2000/2001  French Cup, with Paris Volley
 2000/2001  French Championship, with Paris Volley
 2001/2002  French Championship, with Paris Volley
 2002/2003  French Cup, with Tours VB
 2003/2004  French Cup, with Tours VB
 2003/2004  French Championship, with Tours VB
 2005/2006  Russian Championship, with VC Dynamo Moscow
 2009/2010  Italian SuperCup, with Bre Banca Lannutti Cuneo
 2009/2010  Italian Championship, with Bre Banca Lannutti Cuneo
 2010/2011  Italian Cup, with Bre Banca Lannutti Cuneo
 2010/2011  Italian Championship, with Bre Banca Lannutti Cuneo
 2013/2014  Italian Championship, with Lube Banca Macerata

National team

FIVB World Championship
  2002 Argentina

CEV European Championships
  2003 Germany
  2009 Turkey

Individually
 2001 CEV European Championship - Best Receiver
 2002 FIVB World Championship - Best Libero
 2003 CEV European Championship - Best Digger
 2009 CEV European Championship - Best Libero
 2010 CEV Cup - Best Libero

References

External links
 Hubert Henno at the International Volleyball Federation
 
 
 

1976 births
Living people
Sportspeople from Boulogne-Billancourt
French men's volleyball players
Volleyball players at the 2004 Summer Olympics
Olympic volleyball players of France
French expatriate sportspeople in Italy
French expatriate sportspeople in Russia
Expatriate volleyball players in Russia
Paris Volley players
Tours Volley-Ball players